Roopa Divakar Moudgil is an Indian Police Service officer and currently serving as Managing Director of Karnataka State Handicrafts Development Corporation. She is a 2000 batch Indian Police Service (IPS) officer and has the rank of Inspector General Of Police.

She was also posted as Additional Commandant General, Home Guards & Ex-Officio Additional Director, Civil defence,  commissioner for traffic and road safety and Deputy Inspector General of Prisons in Karnataka. She has given various talks at TEDx conferences in India.

She is also a playback singer in Kannada cinemas and has sung in the Kannada film Bayalaatada Bheemanna starring Ravichandran.

Early life and education

D. Roopa was born in Davanagere. Her father is J. S. Diwakar, a retired engineer and mother is Hemavathi. She has one younger sister , Rohini Divakar, who is an IRS officer of 2008 batch and is posted as Joint Commissioner Of Income Tax. Rohini was also an NCC cadet and has authored many articles in prominent national dailies.<ref></https://www.newindianexpress.com/opinions/2020/mar/06/accept-the-fact-that-she-is-the-prime-force-of-change-2112883.htmlhttps://www.newindianexpress.com/opinions/mindspace/2019/oct/24/crossing-the-seas-no-more-arduous-but-2052166.htmlhttps://www.pressreader.com/india/the-new-indian-express/20190912/282054803731004 https://www.newindianexpress.com/opinions/mindspace/2019/nov/18/bullets-of-choices-at-a-supermarket-2063227.htm</ref>

She completed her graduation from Kuvempu University Karnataka with a gold medal, and post graduation MA in psychology from Bangalore University. Roopa is a well versed with Hindustani Classical music and a trained Bharatnatyam dancer. She has recently released a music video on 2018's International Women's Day to inspire women.

In 2003, she married Munish Moudgil, an alumnus of IIT Bombay and currently an IAS officer. They have two children Anagha Moudgil and Rushil Moudgil.

Career
Roopa cleared her UPSC exam with All-India-rank 43 in 2000. She underwent training at the Sardar Vallabhbhai Patel National Police Academy in Hyderabad, where she was ranked 5th in her batch and was allotted to the Karnataka Cadre.

Soon after the training, Roopa was posted as Superintendent of police (SP) in Dharwad district, north Karnataka. She also served as SP in Gadag district, Bidar and finally in Yadgir district, before she moved to Bengaluru.

In 2007, she was given the role of arresting the then Madhya Pradesh Chief Minister and former Union Minister Uma Bharati in relation to a court case in Hubballi. In 2008, she arrested Mr Yavagal, who was an ex-minister. During this case, she also got her subordinate DSP Mr Masooti, suspended for being in continuous touch with Mr Yavagal and tried to protect the guilty.

She became the first lady police officer in the nation to head the Cyber-Crime police station/division, in 2013. While she was the DCP, City Armed Reserve, Bengaluru, she had withdrawn 216 excess gunmen kept unauthorisedly by 81 politicians. She also had withdrawn 8 new SUVs of the department that unauthorisedly remained with an ex-Chief Minister of Karnataka.

In July 2017, Roopa was transferred from her post as Deputy Inspector General Prisons, a post she took over barely a month ago to the commissioner for traffic and road safety, days after she found irregularities inside the jail. She alleged that AIADMK (Amma) general secretary V K Sasikala was enjoying VIP treatment at Parappana Agrahara central prison. In a report, she submitted to the Home Department and Director General of Police (DGP) for Prison Department H N Sathyanarayana Rao, Deputy Inspector General (Prisons) Roopa claimed that Sasikala was being provided with VIP treatment in jail, a whole corridor comprising five cells had been set aside for her private use, an exclusive kitchen to cook meals for her and the relaxed visiting hours in exchange for a Rs 2-crore bribe to jail officials.

In January 2019, the high-level probe led by retired IAS officer Vinay Kumar, an independent inquiry committee, that inquired into this allegations of irregularities had found and confirmed "serious lapses" and "falsification of records" on the part of senior prison officials in extending special treatment to V.K. Sassikala. It further vindicated her stand, and a case has been registered in Anti-Corruption Bureau(ACB) based on her report. Inquiry committee also found that prison officials were aware that the cells were provided to V.K. Sassikala for private use.

She was selected by Israel Foreign Ministry to be part of "Discover Israel delegation" to promote ties between the two countries. She has been transferred 41 times in 17 years till 2017, has faced privilege motions for naming politicians in FIRs. She is also currently facing a defamation case seeking ₹ 20 crore by DGP Satyanarayana. This case was quashed by the Karnataka High Court in June 2022.

Awards 
She was awarded the President's Police Medal for Meritorious Service in 2016.

References

Indian women police officers
Year of birth missing (living people)
Living people
Karnataka Police
Indian Police Service officers